Paul Mokeski (born January 3, 1957) is an American former basketball player and coach. Standing 7 ft 0 in, he played the center position. He played for five NBA teams, including six seasons with the Milwaukee Bucks.

Mokeski's last coaching position was as head coach of the Nevada Desert Dogs in North American Premier Basketball in 2018.

Early career
Mokeski played at Crespi Carmelite High School in Los Angeles, California. He went on to play two seasons at the University of Kansas, where he accumulated 680 rebounds, placing him 15th in school history.

Professional career
On the Bucks, Mokeski played a role as a key bench player on several deep playoff runs. During the 1984 NBA Playoffs, he averaged career postseason bests of 6.1 points and 5.5 rebounds in only 20 minutes a game. On March 28, 1985, Mokeski scored a career high 21 points, along with grabbing 7 rebounds, in a 121-116 win over the New York Knicks.

Career statistics

NBA

Regular season

|-
| align="left" | 1979–80
| align="left" | Houston
| 12 || - || 9.4 || .333 || .000 || .778 || 2.4 || 0.2 || 0.1 || 0.5 || 2.4
|-
| align="left" | 1980–81
| align="left" | Detroit
| 80 || - || 22.7 || .489 || .000 || .600 || 5.2 || 1.7 || 0.5 || 0.9 || 7.1
|-
| align="left" | 1981–82
| align="left" | Detroit
| 39 || 3 || 13.4 || .441 || .000 || .758 || 3.1 || 0.6 || 0.3 || 0.6 || 3.2
|-
| align="left" | 1981–82
| align="left" | Cleveland
| 28 || 1 || 12.3 || .427 || .000 || .767 || 3.1 || 0.4 || 0.7 || 0.6 || 3.3
|-
| align="left" | 1982–83
| align="left" | Cleveland
| 23 || 18 || 23.4 || .455 || .000 || .615 || 6.0 || 1.1 || 0.5 || 1.0 || 5.5
|-
| align="left" | 1982–83
| align="left" | Milwaukee
| 50 || 1 || 11.8 || .460 || .000 || .810 || 2.4 || 0.5 || 0.2 || 0.4 || 3.2
|-
| align="left" | 1983–84
| align="left" | Milwaukee
| 68 || 4 || 12.3 || .479 || .333 || .694 || 2.4 || 0.6 || 0.2 || 0.4 || 3.8
|-
| align="left" | 1984–85
| align="left" | Milwaukee
| 79 || 6 || 20.1 || .478 || .000 || .698 || 5.2 || 1.3 || 0.4 || 0.4 || 6.2
|-
| align="left" | 1985–86
| align="left" | Milwaukee
| 45 || 0 || 11.6 || .424 || .000 || .735 || 3.1 || 0.7 || 0.1 || 0.1 || 3.2
|-
| align="left" | 1986–87
| align="left" | Milwaukee
| 62 || 3 || 10.1 || .403 || .000 || .719 || 2.2 || 0.4 || 0.3 || 0.2 || 2.4
|-
| align="left" | 1987–88
| align="left" | Milwaukee
| 60 || 0 || 14.1 || .476 || .000 || .708 || 3.7 || 0.4 || 0.5 || 0.5 || 4.2
|-
| align="left" | 1988–89
| align="left" | Milwaukee
| 74 || 0 || 9.3 || .360 || .269 || .784 || 2.5 || 0.5 || 0.4 || 0.3 || 2.2
|-
| align="left" | 1989–90
| align="left" | Cleveland
| 38 || 1 || 11.8 || .420 || .000 || .694 || 2.6 || 0.4 || 0.2 || 0.3 || 4.0
|-
| align="left" | 1990–91
| align="left" | Golden State
| 36 || 1 || 7.1 || .356 || .333 || .800 || 1.9 || 0.3 || 0.2 || 0.1 || 1.6
|- class="sortbottom"
| style="text-align:center;" colspan="2"| Career
| 694 || 38 || 14.0 || .451 || .216 || .694 || 3.4 || 0.7 || 0.3 || 0.4 || 4.0
|}

Playoffs

|-
| align="left" | 1982–83
| align="left" | Milwaukee
| 4 || - || 3.0 || .500 || .000 || .000 || 0.5 || 0.3 || 0.3 || 0.0 || 1.0
|-
| align="left" | 1983–84
| align="left" | Milwaukee
| 16 || - || 20.1 || .540 || .000 || .667 || 5.5 || 0.4 || 0.6 || 0.7 || 6.1
|-
| align="left" | 1984–85
| align="left" | Milwaukee
| 8 || 0 || 19.3 || .444 || .000 || 1.000 || 4.3 || 1.5 || 0.3 || 0.5 || 5.5
|-
| align="left" | 1985–86
| align="left" | Milwaukee
| 14 || 0 || 7.2 || .519 || .000 || .667 || 1.7 || 0.6 || 0.4 || 0.2 || 2.4
|-
| align="left" | 1986–87
| align="left" | Milwaukee
| 12 || 0 || 8.9 || .364 || .000 || .800 || 2.4 || 0.2 || 0.3 || 0.2 || 2.3
|-
| align="left" | 1987–88
| align="left" | Milwaukee
| 4 || 0 || 10.0 || .357 || .000 || .667 || 2.3 || 0.0 || 0.8 || 0.5 || 3.5
|-
| align="left" | 1988–89
| align="left" | Milwaukee
| 5 || 0 || 12.2 || .571 || 1.000 || .750 || 3.4 || 0.6 || 0.0 || 0.0 || 4.6
|-
| align="left" | 1989–90
| align="left" | Cleveland
| 3 || 0 || 3.3 || .500 || .000 || 1.000 || 0.7 || 0.0 || 0.3 || 0.3 || 1.3
|-
| align="left" | 1990–91
| align="left" | Golden State
| 3 || 0 || 2.7 || 1.000 || .000 || .000 || 0.7 || 0.3 || 0.3 || 0.0 || 0.7
|- class="sortbottom"
| style="text-align:center;" colspan="2"| Career
| 69 || 0 || 11.8 || .486 || .250 || .742 || 3.0 || 0.5 || 0.4 || 0.3 || 3.6
|}

College

|-
| align="left" | 1975–76
| align="left" | Kansas
| 18 || - || 26.3 || .482 || - || .730 || 6.4 || - || - || - || 10.6
|-
| align="left" | 1976–77
| align="left" | Kansas
| 14 || - || 17.9 || .396 || - || .625 || 6.1 || - || - || - || 6.1
|-
| align="left" | 1977–78
| align="left" | Kansas
| 28 || - || 23.3 || .518 || - || .574 || 8.5 || - || - || - || 9.3
|-
| align="left" | 1978–79
| align="left" | Kansas
| 29 || - || 33.6 || .498 || - || .725 || 8.3 || - || - || - || 14.1
|- class="sortbottom"
| style="text-align:center;" colspan="2"| Career
| 89 || - || 26.4 || .488 || - || .683 || 7.6 || - || - || - || 10.6
|}

Coaching career
Mokeski was an assistant coach with the Fort Worth Flyers of the NBA D-League. In June 2007, he was hired by the NBA's Charlotte Bobcats as an assistant coach under Sam Vincent. He was let go at the end of the 2007-08 season, when Vincent was fired.

Mokeski was later hired as an assistant coach with the Rio Grande Valley Vipers of the D-League. In September 2011, he became the head coach of the Reno Bighorns. In March 2013, he was relieved of his head coaching duties. He returned to the Vipers for one season before heading north to coach in the National Basketball League of Canada (NBL Canada). In 2016, he was hired as the head coach of the Moncton Miracles, a team that was then being operated by the league. In 2017, the Miracles folded to make way for a new NBL Canada team called the Moncton Magic. NBL Canada commissioner, David Magley, then left the league to become president of a new league called North American Premier Basketball and announced that Mokeski would be one of the inaugural coaches when the league launched in 2018.

On August 16, 2018, Mokeski was named the commissioner of The Basketball League (TBL) for the 2019 season.

Personal life 
Mokeski co-hosts a weekly basketball podcast called “The D.Gerv and Big Mo Show” with Derrick Gervin.

References

External links
 Career statistics
 NBA/College Stats

1957 births
Living people
American expatriate basketball people in Canada
American men's basketball coaches
American men's basketball players
Basketball coaches from Washington (state)
Basketball players from Spokane, Washington
Brampton A's coaches
Centers (basketball)
Charlotte Bobcats assistant coaches
Cleveland Cavaliers players
Continental Basketball Association coaches
Detroit Pistons players
Fort Worth Flyers coaches
Golden State Warriors players
Houston Rockets draft picks
Houston Rockets players
Kansas Jayhawks men's basketball players
Milwaukee Bucks players
Moncton Miracles coaches
North American Premier Basketball coaches
Reno Bighorns coaches
Rio Grande Valley Vipers coaches
United States Basketball League coaches